The 23rd edition of the Men's Asian Amateur Boxing Championships were held from August 29 to September 4, 2005 in Phan Đình Phùng Stadium, Ho Chi Minh City, Vietnam.

Medal summary

Medal table

References
amateur-boxing

External links
Asian Boxing Confederation

2005
Asian Boxing
Boxing
Boxing Championship
21st century in Ho Chi Minh City
Sport in Ho Chi Minh City